The following outline is provided as an overview of and topical guide to the U.S. state of Arkansas:

Arkansas  – state located in the southern region of the United States. It is a land of mountains and valleys, thick forests and fertile plains. Its eastern border is largely defined by the Mississippi River.

General reference

 Names
 Common name: Arkansas
 Pronunciation:  
 Official name: State of Arkansas
 Abbreviations and name codes
 Postal symbol:  AR
 ISO 3166-2 code:  US-AR
 Internet second-level domain:  .ar.us
 Nicknames
Bear State (pronounced "Bar State")
Bowie State
Hot Springs State
 Land of Opportunity (former official nickname; previously used on license plates)
 The Natural State (currently used on license plates)
 Razorback State
Toothpick State
 Wonder State
 Diamond State
 Adjectival: Arkansas
 Demonyms
 Arkansan
 Arkansawyer

Geography of Arkansas

Geography of Arkansas
 Arkansas is: a U.S. state, a federal state of the United States of America
 Location
 Northern hemisphere
 Western hemisphere
 Americas
 North America
 Anglo America
 Northern America
 United States of America
 Contiguous United States
 Southern United States
 South Central United States
 Population of Arkansas: 2,915,918 (2010 U.S. Census)
 Area of Arkansas:
 Atlas of Arkansas

Places in Arkansas

Places in Arkansas
 Historic places in Arkansas
 Ghost towns in Arkansas
 National Historic Landmarks in Arkansas
 National Register of Historic Places listings in Arkansas
 Bridges on the National Register of Historic Places in Arkansas
 National Natural Landmarks in Arkansas
 State parks in Arkansas

Environment of Arkansas

 Climate of Arkansas
 Protected areas in Arkansas
 State forests of Arkansas
 Superfund sites in Arkansas
 Wildlife of Arkansas
 Flora of Arkansas
 Fauna of Arkansas
 Reptiles
 Snakes of Arkansas

Natural geographic features of Arkansas

 Lakes of Arkansas
 Rivers of Arkansas

Regions of Arkansas

 Arkansas Delta
 Arkansas River Valley
 Arkansas Timberlands
 Ark-La-Tex
 Central Arkansas
 Crowley's Ridge
 Four State Area
 Osage Plains
 Ouachita Mountains
 The Ozarks
 Piney Woods
 South Arkansas
 U.S. Interior Highlands
 Western Arkansas

Metropolitan areas of Arkansas

Arkansas metropolitan areas
 Little Rock-North Little Rock-Conway
 Fayetteville‑Springdale‑Rogers
 Fort Smith
 Texarkana
 Jonesboro
 Pine Bluff
 Hot Springs
 Memphis (TN)

Administrative divisions of Arkansas

 The 75 counties of the state of Arkansas
 Municipalities in Arkansas
 Cities in Arkansas
 State capital of Arkansas: Little Rock
 City nicknames in Arkansas

Demography of Arkansas

Demographics of Arkansas

Government and politics of Arkansas

Politics of Arkansas
 Form of government: U.S. state government
 United States congressional delegations from Arkansas
 Arkansas State Capitol
 Political party strength in Arkansas

Branches of the government of Arkansas

Government of Arkansas

Executive branch of the government of Arkansas
Governor of Arkansas
Lieutenant Governor of Arkansas
 Secretary of State of Arkansas
 State departments
 Arkansas Department of Transportation

Legislative branch of the government of Arkansas

 Arkansas General Assembly (bicameral)
 Upper house: Arkansas State Senate
 Lower house: Arkansas House of Representatives

Judicial branch of the government of Arkansas

Courts of Arkansas
 Supreme Court of Arkansas

Law and order in Arkansas

Law of Arkansas
 Cannabis in Arkansas
 Capital punishment in Arkansas
 Individuals executed in Arkansas
 Constitution of Arkansas
 Crime in Arkansas
 Gun laws in Arkansas
 Law enforcement in Arkansas
 Law enforcement agencies in Arkansas
 Arkansas State Police

Military in Arkansas

 Arkansas Air National Guard
 Arkansas Army National Guard

History of Arkansas

History of Arkansas, by period 
Indigenous peoples
French colony of Louisiane, 1699–1764
Treaty of Fontainebleau of 1762
Spanish (though predominantly Francophone) district of Alta Luisiana, 1764–1803
Third Treaty of San Ildefonso of 1800
French district of Haute-Louisiane, 1803
Louisiana Purchase of 1803
Unorganized U.S. territory created by the Louisiana Purchase, 1803–1804
District of Louisiana, 1804–1805
Territory of Louisiana, 1805–1812
Territory of Missouri, (1812–1819)–1821
Adams-Onis Treaty of 1819
Territory of Arkansaw, 1819–1836
State of Arkansas becomes the 25th state admitted to the United States of America on June 15, 1836
Mexican–American War, April 25, 1846 – February 2, 1848
American Civil War, April 12, 1861 – May 13, 1865
Arkansas in the American Civil War
Ninth state to declare secession from the United States of America on May 6, 1861
Ninth state admitted to the Confederate States of America on May 18, 1861
Battle of Pea Ridge, March 7–8, 1862
Battle of Whitney's Lane, May 19, 1862
Battle of Saint Charles, June 17, 1862
Battle of Hill's Plantation, July 7, 1862
Battle of Cane Hill, November 28, 1862
Battle of Prairie Grove, December 7, 1862
Battle of Arkansas Post, January 9–11, 1863
Battle of Chalk Bluff, May 1–2, 1863
Battle of Helena, July 4, 1863
Battle of Devil's Backbone, September 1, 1863
Battle of Bayou Fourche, September 10, 1863
Battle of Pine Bluff,  October 25, 1863
Battle of Elkin's Ferry, April 3–4, 1864
Battle of Prairie D'Ane, April 9–13, 1864
Battle of Poison Spring, April 18, 1864
Battle of Marks' Mills, April 25, 1864
Battle of Jenkins' Ferry, April 30, 1864
Battle of Old River Lake, June 5–6, 1864
Arkansas in Reconstruction, 1865–1868
Second former Confederate state readmitted to the United States of America on June 22, 1868
Hot Springs National Park established on March 4, 1921
Civil Rights Movement from December 1, 1955, to January 20, 1969
Little Rock Crisis, September 4, 1957 – May 27, 1958
Bill Clinton becomes 42nd President of the United States on January 20, 1993

History of Arkansas, by region 
 History of Little Rock, Arkansas

History of Arkansas, by subject 
 History of universities in Arkansas
 History of the University of Arkansas

Publications about Arkansas history
 Encyclopedia of Arkansas History & Culture

Culture of Arkansas

Culture of Arkansas
 Museums in Arkansas
 Religion in Arkansas
 The Church of Jesus Christ of Latter-day Saints in Arkansas
 Episcopal Diocese of Arkansas
 Scouting in Arkansas
 State symbols of Arkansas
 Flag of Arkansas
 Great Seal of Arkansas

The arts in Arkansas
 Music of Arkansas

Economy and infrastructure of Arkansas

Economy of Arkansas
 Communications in Arkansas
 Newspapers in Arkansas
 Radio stations in Arkansas
 Television stations in Arkansas
 Media in Little Rock, Arkansas
 Health care in Arkansas
 Hospitals in Arkansas
 Transportation in Arkansas
 Airports in Arkansas
 Roads in Arkansas
 U.S. Highways in Arkansas
 Interstate Highways in Arkansas
 State highways in Arkansas
 State highway spurs in Arkansas

Education in Arkansas

Education in Arkansas
 Schools in Arkansas
 School districts in Arkansas
 High schools in Arkansas
 Colleges and universities in Arkansas
 University of Arkansas
 Arkansas State University

See also

Topic overview:
Arkansas

Index of Arkansas-related articles

References

External links

 
 
 
Official State website
Arkansas State Code (the state statutes of Arkansas)
Arkansas State Databases – Annotated list of searchable databases produced by Arkansas state agencies and compiled by the Government Documents Roundtable of the American Library Association.
USDA Arkansas State Facts
Official State tourism website
The Encyclopedia of Arkansas History & Culture
Energy & Environmental Data for Arkansas
U.S. Census Bureau
 2000 Census of Population and Housing for Arkansas, U.S. Census Bureau
USGS real-time, geographic, and other scientific resources of Arkansas

Arkansas
Arkansas